The 1947 WANFL season was the 63rd season of senior football in Perth, Western Australia. With the background of war completely removed, 1947 saw the WANFL begin a golden age of growth dominated by the two Fremantle clubs, West Perth and Perth, who made the league for the following nine seasons a de facto hierarchy led by South Fremantle and West Perth, who respectively won 128 and 121 of their 159 home-and-away matches between 1947 and 1954. Zones with vastly different populations and large unzoned areas allowed these more successful and financially secure clubs to monopolise the leading player talent.

The red and whites won their first premiership for thirty seasons – ironically under the leadership of former Cardinal captain-coach Ross Hutchinson who transferred for this season. Perth, in the doldrums with only three finals appearances and three seasons with more wins than losses since 1918, began thirty years of prominence during which they won six premierships. In contrast, Subiaco, after two promising postwar seasons were beset by poor recruiting and conflicts over coaching, so that they lost their first eleven games and fell from third to last. The Maroons were not to again win more than five matches in a season until 1956, nor finish above any rival except Swan Districts until 1957. East Fremantle, after their record undefeated season in 1946, fell to fourth place. Old Easts toured Sydney and Canberra in August during the Carnival, defeating a Canberra team by 77 points at Manuka Oval on 9 August, and a New South Wales state team by 23 points on 10 August.

For the first time the WANFL allowed payments to players in the form of a "Provident Fund" accessed after each player's retirement and totalling 15 shillings per match – increased to 30 shillings in 1956.

Home-and-away season

Round 1

Round 2 (Labour Day)

Round 3

Round 4

Round 5

Round 6 (Foundation Day)

Round 7

Round 8

Round 9

Round 10

Round 11

Round 12

Round 13

Round 14

Round 15

Round 16

Round 17

Round 18

Round 19

Ladder

Finals

First semi-final

Second semi-final

Preliminary final

Grand Final

Notes
Pressure from some WANFL board members to eliminate zoning existed as late as 1955.The crowd was originally listed as 17,538.Father of 1980s Claremont, Carlton and Glenelg spearhead Warren

References

External links
Official WAFL website
Western Australian National Football League (WANFL), 1947

West Australian Football League seasons
WANFL